Mohamed Tarek Belaribi (born 21 February 1972 in Algiers) is the Algerian Minister of Housing, Urban Planning and the City. He was appointed as minister on 21 February 2021.

Education 
Belaribi holds a Bachelor in Civil Engineering.

References

External links 

 Ministry of Housing, Urbal Planning and the City

Living people
21st-century Algerian politicians
Algerian politicians
Government ministers of Algeria
Housing ministers of Algeria
Urban planning ministers of Algeria
1972 births